Protein BEX1 also known as brain-expressed X-linked protein 1 is a protein that in humans is encoded by the BEX1 gene.

References

Further reading